This list of museums in New Orleans, Louisiana contains museums which are defined for this context as institutions (including nonprofit organizations, government entities, and private businesses) that collect and care for objects of cultural, artistic, scientific, or historical interest and make their collections or related exhibits available for public viewing. Museums that exist only in cyberspace (i.e., virtual museums) are not included. Also included are non-profit and university art galleries.

Museums

Defunct museums
 Musée Conti Wax Museum, closed in 2016
 New Orleans Jazz Museum, since 2015, the collection is now on display at the New Orleans Mint

See also
 List of museums in Louisiana
 Aquarium of the Americas
 Audubon Nature Institute
 Audubon Zoo

References

 
New Orleans
Museums
Louisiana education-related lists